Thomas Brunner (born 10 August 1962 in Blaibach) is a German football coach and a former player who manages German lower-league side 1. FC Schnaittach.

Career record

Honours
 DFB-Pokal finalist: 1981–82

References

External links
 

1962 births
Living people
People from Cham (district)
Sportspeople from the Upper Palatinate
Association football midfielders
German footballers
Germany youth international footballers
Germany under-21 international footballers
German football managers
Bundesliga players
2. Bundesliga players
1. FC Nürnberg players
1. FC Nürnberg managers
Bundesliga managers
Footballers from Bavaria